Watkins is an unincorporated community in Mill Creek Township, Union County, Ohio, United States.

History
Watkins was laid out and platted in 1838, and named for Joseph S. Watkins, a government surveyor. The Watkins Post office was established on March 18, 1840, but was discontinued on July 31, 1908. The mail service is now sent through the Marysville branch.

References 

Unincorporated communities in Union County, Ohio
Unincorporated communities in Ohio